James Matthew Ragen, Sr. (August 9, 1880 – August 15, 1946) was an Irish businessman and co-founder of the Chicago-based street gang and political club Ragen's Colts.

Biography
After taking control of the social organization Ragen's Athletic and Benevolent Association with his brother Frank Ragen in the late 1890s, later known as Ragen's Colts, Ragen would soon become involved in the gang's usual activities including political intimidation, labor slugging and particularly bootlegging during Prohibition. A veteran of Chicago's "circulation wars" during the 1910s, Ragen would work under Moses Annenberg with other future Chicago mobsters such as Maurice Enright, Walter Stevens and Peter Gentleman in "bootjacking" or forcing downtown newspaper stands to sell Chicago American.

By the early 1930s, Ragen had begun overseeing the day to day office operations for the Nationwide News Service (then known as the General News Service), the sole distributors of racetrack and other gambling results nationwide, under the control of Moses Annenberg. An invaluable source of revenue for legal and illegal gambling alike, the organization was highly sought after among organized crime leaders throughout the decade. Faced with pressure from the Chicago Outfit and the Roosevelt administration, who sought to charge Annenberg with anti-trust and income tax evasion charges Annenberg was eventually forced by Democratic political opponents to sell the National News Service to Ragen on November 15, 1939.

Ragen however, continued to fend off strong arm tactics of Tony Accardo, Murray Humphreys and Jake Guzik in their attempts to pressure Ragen to sell to the Chicago Outfit. After initial attempts to intimidate Ragen failed, the syndicate began a rival news service based in California, Trans-American Publishing, under the control of Benjamin "Bugsy" Siegel (where bookies were forced to pay up to a daily $100 subscription fee). Another competing syndicate news service, Dan Serritella's Blue Scratch Sheet, was also established in Chicago, however, it soon went out of business. The failure of these news services convinced syndicate leaders to take the National News Service by force.

Fearing for his life, Ragen confided in the spring of 1946 in his friend, newspaper reporter and syndicated columnist, Drew Pearson. Pearson took the information he received from Ragen related to the activities and the structure of organized crime in Chicago to his friend, U.S. Attorney General Tom C. Clark and asked Clark for FBI protection for Ragen. In the years that followed, Pearson reported several times on the events leading to Ragen's death and in Pearson's October 26, 1963 column titled, "'Songbird' Was Murdered"   he reports that Tom C. Clark had assigned twelve FBI agents provide protection to Ragen in 1946 while they interrogated him in Chicago. After the FBI fact checked Ragen's statements to them, Tom Clark confirmed to Pearson that the facts learned from Ragen were true and the top echelon of the Chicago mob "led to very high places." The names of seemingly respected politicians and businessmen revealed by Ragen to the FBI were words familiar to every Chicago household and some believed they had reformed, but Pearson wrote,
"Yet they still controlled the mob." Pearson added that Tom C. Clark's Justice Department had no federal jurisdiction to prosecute the suspects Ragen named and after completing their questioning of Ragen and verifying his claims, the FBI withdrew their protection of him.

Pearson wrote in his diary:
"The FBI interviewed Ragen at great length. They brought back a multitude of tips, leads, and evidence. Tom Clark told me afterward that it led to very high places. J. Edgar Hoover intimated the same thing. He said the people Ragen pointed to had now reformed. I learned later that it pointed to the Hilton hotel chain; Henry Crown, the big Jewish financier in Chicago; and Walter Annenberg, publisher of the Philadelphia Inquirer."

While driving down State Street, Ragen was ambushed at Pershing Road and was seriously wounded in the arms and legs by a shotgun blast from syndicate gunman on June 24, 1946. Taken to a nearby hospital, Ragen signed an affidavit identifying the gunman before his death on August 15, following a mysteriously administered dose of mercury. The affidavit was lost however when State Attorney William Touhy was unable to prosecute against those named by Ragen.

References

Further reading
English, T.J. Paddy Whacked: The Untold Story of the Irish American Gangster. New York: HarperCollins, 2005. 
Fox, Stephen. Blood and Power: Organized Crime in Twentieth-Century America. New York: William Morrow and Company, 1989. 
Kelly, Robert J. Encyclopedia of Organized Crime in the United States. Westport, Connecticut: Greenwood Press, 2000. 
Sifakis, Carl. The Mafia Encyclopedia. New York: Da Capo Press, 2005. 
Sifakis, Carl. The Encyclopedia of American Crime. New York: Facts on File Inc., 2001. 
Cohen, Andrew. The Racketeer's Progress: Chicago and the Struggle for the Modern American Economy, 1900-1940. Cambridge University Press, 2004. 
Denton, Sally and Morris, Roger. The Money and the Power: The Making of Las Vegas and Its Hold on America, 1947-2000. New York: Alfred A. Knopf, 2001. 
Enright, Laura L. Chicago's Most Wanted: The Top Ten Book of Murderous Mobsters, Midway Monsters, and Windy City Oddities. Dulles, Virginia: Potomac Books Inc., 2005. 
Fried, Albert. The Rise and Fall of the Jewish Gangster in America. New York: Holt, Rinehart and Winston, 1980. 
Moldea, Dan E. Interference: How Organized Crime Influences Professional Football. New York: William Morrow, 1989. 
Reppetto, Thomas A. American Mafia: A History of Its Rise to Power. New York: Henry Holt & Co., 2004. 
Scott, Peter Dale. Deep Politics and the Death of JFK. Berkeley: University of California Press, 1993.

External links
The History of the Race Wire Service - Part Three: Ragen and McBride and the End of the Race Wire by Allan May

1880 births
1946 deaths
American gangsters of Irish descent
American gangsters
People murdered by the Chicago Outfit
Businesspeople from Chicago
American crime bosses
Murdered American gangsters
People murdered in Illinois
Male murder victims
Deaths by firearm in Illinois
Gangsters from Chicago
20th-century American businesspeople
Irish emigrants to the United States (before 1923)